Kevin Kline is an American actor known for his performances in film, television and the theatre. He has received an Academy Award, three Tony Awards and a Screen Actors Guild Award.

Major associations

Academy Awards

British Academy Film Awards

Golden Globe Awards

Primetime Emmy Awards

Screen Actors Guild Award

Tony Awards

Other awards

Drama Desk Awards

MTV Movie Awards

Satellite Awards

References

External links
 
 
 
 
 

1947 births
20th-century American male actors
21st-century American male actors
American male film actors
American male Shakespearean actors
American male stage actors
American male television actors
American male musical theatre actors
American male voice actors
American people of German-Jewish descent
American people of Irish descent
Drama Desk Award winners
Indiana University alumni
Juilliard School alumni
Outstanding Performance by a Male Actor in a Miniseries or Television Movie Screen Actors Guild Award winners